Pentachlorobenzenethiol is a chemical compound from the group of thiols and organochlorine compounds.

Synthesis
Pentachlorobenzenethiol can be obtained from hexachlorobenzene.

Properties
Pentachlorobenzenethiol is a combustible gray solid with an unpleasant odor, practically insoluble in water. It has a monoclinic crystal structure. The compound is not well-biodegradable and presumably bioaccumulable and toxic for aquatic organisms. 
Pentachlorobenzenethiol is itself a metabolite of hexachlorobenzene and is found in the urine and the excretions of animals receiving hexachlorobenzene. Pentachlorobenzenethiol has a high potential for long-range transport via air as it is very slowly degraded in atmosphere.

Applications
Pentachlorobenzenethiol is used in the rubber industry. The compound is added to rubber (both natural and synthetic) to facilitate processing (mastication).

See also
Chlorobenzene
Dichlorobenzene
Trichlorobenzene
Pentachlorobenzene
Hexachlorobenzene

References

External links
Preparation of pentachlorothiophenol US 2922820 A

Benzene derivatives
Thiols
Organochlorides
Foul-smelling chemicals